Marton is a railway station on the Esk Valley Line, which runs between  and  via . It is owned by Network Rail and managed by Northern Trains.

History
The station was opened as Ormesby on 25 February 1854 by the Middlesbrough and Guisborough Railway. It was renamed Marton by British Rail on 17 May 1982.

The nearby station, James Cook, was opened on 18 May 2014, and serves James Cook University Hospital.

Facilities
Station facilities were upgraded in 2012 as part of the Tees Valley Metro project. The package for the station included a new fully lit waiting shelter, renewed station signage and the installation of CCTV. A long-line Public Address system (PA) has been also been installed, with pre-recorded train announcements.

A passenger information screen with details of train times was installed at the station in March 2016. A ticket machine was installed at the station in 2019. The station has a limited number of car parking spaces.

Services

Following the May 2021 timetable change, the station is served by an hourly service between Middlesbrough and Nunthorpe, with two trains per day (excluding Sunday) continuing to Battersby, and six per day (four on Sunday) continuing to Whitby. Most trains continue to Newcastle via Hartlepool. All services are operated by Northern Trains.

Rolling stock used: Class 156 Super Sprinter and Class 158 Express Sprinter

References

Sources

External links
 
 

Railway stations in Redcar and Cleveland
DfT Category F2 stations
Former North Eastern Railway (UK) stations
Railway stations in Great Britain opened in 1854
Northern franchise railway stations